Flat Stanley is an American children's book series written by author Jeff Brown (January 1, 1926 – December 3, 2003). The idea for the book began as a bedtime story for Brown’s sons, which Brown turned into the first Flat Stanley book. The first book featured illustrations by Tomi Ungerer and was published in 1964. Brown did not continue the series until more than two decades later, when he published five more books: Stanley and the Magic Lamp, Stanley in Space, Stanley’s Christmas Adventure, Invisible Stanley, and Stanley, Flat Again! 

By 2003, the Flat Stanley series had sold almost a million copies in the United States, and the stories had been translated into French, German, Spanish, Italian, Japanese, and Hebrew.

Since Brown's death in 2003, other children's book authors, including Sara Pennypacker and Josh Greenhut, have continued the series under a new name, Flat Stanley's Worldwide Adventures.

In 2009, a musical adaptation, also entitled Flat Stanley, opened at the Djanogly Theatre, Nottingham. It featured a script by Mike Kenny and songs by Julian Butler. The musical was well received and was revived in 2014 for a short tour.

Synopsis of original book
The book recounts the adventures of Stanley Lambchop after he is squashed flat by a bulletin board while sleeping. He survives and decides to make the best of being flat. Soon, he discovers that he is able to enter locked rooms by sliding under the door. Over the course of the story, he also rolls up to go out to a park, and he is used as a kite by his brother. Another special advantage of being flat is that Flat Stanley can visit his friends in California by mailing himself in an envelope. Stanley even helps catch art museum thieves by disguising himself as a painting on the wall. Eventually, Stanley becomes tired of his flatness, and his brother restores his proper shape with a bicycle pump.

Books in the series

Books by Jeff Brown, illustrated by Macky Pamintuan:
Flat Stanley (1964)
Stanley and the Magic Lamp (1983) - Stanley and Arthur discover a magic lamp containing a genie.
Stanley In Space (1990) - The Lambchops are sent into space by the President to forge peace with a group of miniature humanoid aliens who inhabit the newly discovered planet Tyrra.
Stanley's Christmas Adventure (1993) - Santa Claus's daughter, Sarah Christmas, arrives unexpectedly in the Lambchop household during the holiday season, and convinces them to help bring back Santa's jolly spirit.
 Invisible Stanley (1995) - After a thunderstorm occurs one night, Stanley mysteriously turns invisible.
Stanley, Flat Again! (2003) - Stanley is hit with a rubber ball while simultaneously hitting his shelf, causing him to return to his flat state. He has many unusual adventures following this odd event.

At the time of his death, Brown was in the process of re-writing the original book. The rewrite was published by Scholastic in 2006. Since then, other authors have continued the series under the name Flat Stanley's Worldwide Adventures.

Books by other authors:
 The Mount Rushmore Calamity (2009) - author Sara Pennypacker
 The Great Egyptian Grave Robbery (2009) - author Sara Pennypacker 
 The Japanese Ninja Surprise (2009) - author Sara Pennypacker
 The Intrepid Canadian Expedition (2009) - author Sara Pennypacker
 The Amazing Mexican Secret (2010) - author Josh Greenhut
 The African Safari Discovery (2011) - author Josh Greenhut
 The Flying Chinese Wonders (2011) - author Josh Greenhut
 The Australian Boomerang Bonanza (2011) - author Josh Greenhut
 The US Capital Commotion (2011) - author Josh Greenhut
 Showdown at the Alamo (2014) - author Josh Greenhut
 Framed in France (2014) - author Josh Greenhut
 Escape to California (2014) - author David Ross
 The Midnight Ride of Flat Revere (2016) - author Kate Egan
 On a Mission for Her Majesty (2017) - author Kate Egan
Lost in New York (2018) - author Kate Egan

The Flat Stanley Project 

The Flat Stanley Project began in 1995 under the direction of Dale Hubert, a third grade school teacher in London, Ontario, Canada. The project is meant to facilitate letter-writing between schoolchildren as they document where Flat Stanley has accompanied them around the world. The goal of the project is to increase reading and writing skills, as well as teaching children about people and cultures from different places. Dale Hubert received the Prime Minister's Award for Teaching Excellence in 2001 for his work in creating the Flat Stanley Project.

The Flat Stanley Project provides an opportunity for students to make connections with students from other member schools who have signed up for the project. Students begin by reading the book and becoming familiar with Flat Stanley's story. Then, they create paper "Flat Stanleys" (representative drawings of the Stanley Lambchop character) and keep a journal for a few days, documenting the places and activities in which Flat Stanley is involved. Each student's Flat Stanley and its respective journal are then mailed to students at other schools. The students at those schools are asked to treat the Flat Stanley as a visiting guest and add to the respective journal, then return them both after a short period of time. The project has many similarities to the traveling gnome prank, except that the Flat Stanley Project focuses more on literacy.

As a part of the project, students may plot Flat Stanley's travels on maps and share the contents of their journals. Additionally, Flat Stanleys often return with a photo or postcard from its visit. Despite the project's traditional reliance on letters, some teachers prefer to use e-mail due to its quicker travel time.

In 2008, more than 6,000 classes from 47 countries took part in the Flat Stanley Project.

Arranging exchanges 
Teachers can register and arrange exchanges with other classrooms on the Flat Stanley Project website. Another option is for teachers to ask students to get their parents' permission to address an envelope and send the paper doll to a friend or relative in another state.

The Flat Stanley Project uses blogs for teachers, parents, and students to publish stories, describe local traditions and scenery, and post photos. Flat Stanley photos are also archived in an online Picture Gallery.

In popular culture 
The project was featured in a 2004 episode of the animated TV series King of the Hill, in which Nancy Gribble receives a Flat Stanley in the mail. Peggy Hill and Luanne Platter photograph it in a number of dangerous situations, resulting in the school's Flat Stanley Project being canceled.

According to the February 26, 2009 broadcast of Countdown with Keith Olbermann, Flat Stanley was on board the US Airways Flight 1549, which landed safely in the Hudson River.  He was carried to safety in the briefcase of his traveling companion.

In early 2010, Darren Haas, a Flat Stanley advocate and applications architect, approached Dale Hubert with the idea of turning the Flat Stanley Project concept into an app for the iPhone. The app was released in late 2010, but is no longer available in the App Store. 

Also in 2010, fans of the baseball team St. Louis Cardinals were asked (via the team website) to petition US President Barack Obama to award the Presidential Medal of Freedom to Baseball Hall of Famer Stan Musial. A "Flat Stan" downloadable cutout figure was made available to encourage Cardinals fans to take a photo with Musial's caricature and send them in as petitions.

In 2022, cast member Sarah Sherman held up a Flat Stanley during the closing credits of an episode of Saturday Night Live.

Dog Man Unleashed - the second in the series of Dog Man novels - contains a homage to Flat Stanley: the antagonist feigns a crush by cutting out a cardboard likeness of himself, and inserts it under a bulletin board.

References

External links

The Flat Stanley Project.
Flat Stanley's Adventures Daily Blog
Flat Stanley in Jerusalem
Flat Stanley and Flat Stella Explore the Environment at the U.S. Environmental Protection Agency
This show is part of the Broadway Junior Collection:

Book series introduced in 1964
Child characters in literature
Male characters in literature
Characters in children's literature
Series of children's books
Harper & Row books
1964 children's books
Literary characters introduced in 1964
Fictional characters who can change size
Fictional characters who can stretch themselves